Ashaiman is one of the constituencies represented in the Parliament of Ghana. It elects one Member of Parliament (MP) by the first past the post system of election. The Ashaiman constituency is located in the Tema Municipal District of the Greater Accra Region of Ghana.

Boundaries
The seat is located entirely within the Accra Metropolitan Area of the Greater Accra Region of Ghana.

Members of Parliament

Elections

See also
List of Ghana Parliament constituencies

References 

Parliamentary constituencies in the Greater Accra Region